Childeric I (reconstructed Frankish: *Hildirīk;  – 481 AD) was a Frankish leader in the northern part of imperial Roman Gaul and a member of the Merovingian dynasty, described as a king (Latin rex), both on his Roman-style seal ring, which was buried with him, and in fragmentary later records of his life. He was father of Clovis I, who acquired effective control over all or most Frankish kingdoms, and a significant part of Roman Gaul.

Biography
Childeric's father is recorded by several sources including Gregory of Tours to have been Merovech, whose name is the basis of the Merovingian dynasty. Gregory reports that Merovech was reputed by some to be a descendant of Chlodio who was an earlier Frankish king who had conquered Roman Gaulish areas first in the Silva Carbonaria, then in Tournai, Cambrai and as far south as the Somme. This is roughly the definition of the Roman province of Belgica Secunda (approximately the "Belgium" defined by Julius Caesar centuries earlier, the region stretching from north of Paris to the Flemish coast) and later a letter of Saint Remigius to Childeric's son Clovis I implies that Childeric had been the administrative chief of this Roman province.

In records about specific actions of Childeric himself, he is mainly associated with the Roman military actions around the Loire river, where he appears in records involving the Gallo-Roman general Aegidius. According to Gregory of Tours, Childeric was exiled to "Thuringia" for eight years due to Frankish distaste at his debauchery and his seduction of his subjects' daughters. In the meantime, according to Gregory, Aegidius himself took up the title of king of the Franks. Upon his return from exile, Childeric joined his host's wife, Queen Basina, who bore their son Clovis.

Guy Halsall connects the story to Roman politics, Aegidius being an appointee of Majorian:

Halsall (p. 269) speculates that Childeric probably began a Roman military career in the service of Flavius Aetius who defeated Attila in Gaul, and he points out that much of his military career appears to have played out far from the Frankish homelands. Ulrich Nonn (map p. 37, and pp. 99–100), following his teacher Eugen Ewig, believes that the exile story reflects a real sequence of events whereby Childeric was a leader of "Salian" or "Belgian" Franks based in the Romanized areas conquered by Chlodio, who were allies under the lordship of Aegidius, but eventually able to take over his power when he and his imperial patron died. (Childeric's son Clovis I later fought Aegidius' son Syagrius who was remembered as a King of Romans, and who had control of Soissons in the south of Belgica Secunda.)

In a passage normally considered to have come from a lost collection of annals, Gregory (II.18) gives a sequence of events which are very difficult to interpret. In 463 Childeric and Aegidius successfully repelled the Visigoths of Theodoric II from Orléans on the Loire. After the death of Aegidius soon after, Childeric and a comes ("count") Paul are recorded defending the Loire region from Saxon raiders, who were possibly coordinating with the Goths now under Euric. Childeric and Paul fought Saxons under the command of a leader named "Adovacrius" (sometimes given by modern authors in either an Anglo-Saxon spelling form, Eadwacer, or in a spelling the same as used for his contemporary the future King of Italy Odoacer, with whom he is sometimes equated). The origin of these "Saxons" is however unclear, and they are described as being based upon islands somewhere in the Loire region.

Soon after this passage, Gregory of Tours (II.19) reports that Childeric coordinated with "Odovacrius", this time normally assumed to be the King of Italy, against Allemanni who had entered Italy. While some authors interpret these Allemani to be Alans, a people established in the Loire region in this period, there is no consensus on this, because the reference in this case is not apparently to events near the Loire.

Marriage, children, and death
Gregory of Tours, in his History of the Franks, mentions several siblings of Clovis within his narrative, apparently thus children of Childeric:
Clovis I (died 511), whose mother was Basina.
Audofleda, Queen of the Ostrogoths, wife of Theodoric the Great. Gregory III.31 also mentions their daughter Amalasuntha.
Lanthechild. Gregory II.31 mentions she had been an Arian but converted to Catholicism with Clovis.
Albofleda (died approximately 500). Gregory II.31 mentions that she died soon after being baptized with Clovis.

Childeric is generally considered to have died in 481 or 482 based on Gregory's reports that his son Clovis died in 511 and had ruled 30 years.

Tomb
Childeric's tomb was discovered in 1653 not far from the 12th-century church of Saint-Brice in Tournai,  now in Belgium.  Numerous precious objects were found, including jewels of gold and garnet cloisonné, gold coins, a gold bull's head, and a ring with the king's name inscribed. Some 300 golden winged insects (usually viewed as bees or cicadas) were also found which had been placed on the king's cloak. Archduke Leopold William, governor of the Southern Netherlands (today's Belgium), had the find published in Latin.  The treasure went first to the Habsburgs in Vienna, then as a gift to King Louis XIV of France, who was not impressed with the treasure and stored it in the royal library, which became the Bibliothèque Nationale de France during the Revolution.

On the night of November 5–6, 1831, the treasure of Childeric was among 80 kg of treasure stolen from the Library and melted down for the gold. A few pieces were retrieved from where they had been hidden in the Seine, including two of the bees.  The record of the treasure, however, now exists only in the fine engravings made at the time of its discovery and in some reproductions made for the Habsburgs.

Origin of Napoleonic bees

When Napoleon was looking for a heraldic symbol to trump the Capetian fleur-de-lys, he settled on Childeric's bees as symbols of the French Empire. The minutes of a meeting of the Conseil d'État held at Saint-Cloud in June 1804 suggest that it approved the symbolism of the bees on a suggestion by Cambacérès. The design was made by Vivant Denon, Director of the Louvre.

Notes

References

External links
     
Livius.org on Childeric
Photo: Merovingian sword and scabbard mounts from the tomb of King Childeric featuring silver-gilt and cloisonné garnets
"A note on Childeric's bees": the discovery of his tomb: follow the links for the engravings of Childeric's treasure and the two remaining gold bees.

 
 

Frankish warriors
Merovingian kings
Magistri militum
430s births
480s deaths
Year of birth uncertain
Year of death uncertain
5th-century Frankish people
5th-century monarchs in Europe
Deaths in Belgium